Lithium tetrafluoroborate is an inorganic compound with the formula LiBF4.  It is a white crystalline powder.  It has been extensively tested for use in commercial secondary batteries, an application that exploits its high solubility in nonpolar solvents.

Applications
Although BF4− has high ionic mobility, solutions of its Li+ salt are less conductive than other less associated salts.  As an electrolyte in lithium-ion batteries, LiBF4 offers some advantages relative to the more common LiPF6.  It exhibits greater thermal stability and moisture tolerance.  For example, LiBF4 can tolerate a moisture content up to 620 ppm at room temperature whereas LiPF6 readily hydrolyzes into toxic POF3 and HF gases, often destroying the battery's electrode materials. Disadvantages of the electrolyte include a relatively low conductivity and difficulties forming a stable solid electrolyte interface with graphite electrodes.

Thermal stability
Because LiBF4 and other alkali-metal salts thermally decompose to evolve boron trifluoride, the salt is commonly used as a convenient source of the chemical at the laboratory scale:

 LiBF4 → LiF + BF3

Production
LiBF4 is a byproduct in the industrial synthesis of diborane:
8 BF3  +  6 LiH  →  B2H6  +  6 LiBF4

LiBF4 can also be synthesized from LiF and BF3 in an appropriate solvent that is resistant to fluorination by BF3 (e.g. HF, BrF3, or liquified SO2):

 LiF + BF3 → LiBF4

References

Tetrafluoroborates
Lithium salts
Electrolytes